Francisco Sánchez (born 5 December 1970) is a Spanish wrestler. He competed in the men's freestyle 48 kg at the 1992 Summer Olympics.

References

1970 births
Living people
Spanish male sport wrestlers
Olympic wrestlers of Spain
Wrestlers at the 1992 Summer Olympics
Sportspeople from Bilbao
20th-century Spanish people